Tessin is an Amt in the district of Rostock, in Mecklenburg-Vorpommern, Germany. The seat of the Amt is in Tessin.

The Amt Tessin consists of the following municipalities:
 Cammin
 Gnewitz
 Grammow
 Nustrow
 Selpin
 Stubbendorf
 Tessin
 Thelkow
 Zarnewanz

Ämter in Mecklenburg-Western Pomerania